Let Me Be the One is a single by Exposé, released on May 15, 1987. It was written and produced by Lewis Martineé and appears on their debut album, Exposure. The lead vocals on the song were performed by Gioia Bruno.

Reception
Released as a single in August 1987, "Let Me Be the One" became the group's third consecutive top-ten single on the Billboard Hot 100 chart in October of that year, when it peaked at No. 7. The song also reached No. 2 on the Billboard Hot Dance Club Play chart. In the United Kingdom, the song reached No. 76 on the British pop chart.

Track listing
7" single

12" single

UK 12" single

Germany CD single

Charts

Weekly charts

Year-end charts

References

External links
12" single info from discogs.com

Exposé (group) songs
1987 songs
1987 singles
Pop ballads
Songs written by Lewis Martineé
Arista Records singles